JAG (U.S. military acronym for Judge Advocate General) is an American legal drama television show with a distinct U.S. Navy and Marine Corps theme, created by Donald P. Bellisario, and produced by Belisarius Productions in association with Paramount Network Television (after 2006 known as CBS Studios). The first season was co-produced with NBC Productions.

Originally pitched towards the studio, network, and later also marketed for audiences as a Top Gun meets A Few Good Men hybrid series, the pilot episode of JAG first aired on NBC on September 23, 1995, but the series was later canceled on May 22, 1996, after finishing 79th in the ratings, leaving one episode unaired. Rival network CBS picked up the series for a Mid-season replacement, beginning on January 3, 1997. For several seasons, JAG climbed in the ratings and was on the air for nine additional seasons. JAG furthermore spawned the hit series NCIS, which in turn spun off NCIS: Los Angeles, NCIS: New Orleans, and NCIS: Hawaiʻi.

In total, 227 episodes were produced over 10 seasons. At the time of the original airing of its fifth season in the United States, JAG was seen in over 90 countries worldwide. JAG entered syndication in early 1999.

Series overview

Episodes

Season 1 (1995–96)

This season stars David James Elliott as Harmon Rabb, and Tracey Needham as Meg Austin. Patrick Labyorteaux and John M. Jackson both have continuous arcs throughout the season. Catherine Bell guest stars in one episode, Andrea Parker recurs.

Season 2 (1997)

This season stars David James Elliott as Harmon Rabb. Catherine Bell joins the main cast as Sarah MacKenzie, alongside Patrick Labyorteaux as Bud Roberts, and John M. Jackson as A.J. Chegwidden. Steven Culp and Karri Turner have continuous arcs throughout the season. Chuck Carrington recurs.

Season 3 (1997–98)

This season stars David James Elliott as Harmon Rabb, Catherine Bell as Sarah MacKenzie, Patrick Labyorteaux as Bud Roberts, and John M. Jackson as Admiral AJ Chegwidden.  Steven Culp and Karri Turner have continuous arcs throughout the season. Tracey Needham guest stars in a flashback, Chuck Carrington recurs.

Season 4 (1998–99)

This season stars David James Elliott as Harmon Rabb, Catherine Bell as Sarah MacKenzie, Patrick Labyorteaux as Bud Roberts, and John M. Jackson as Admiral AJ Chegwidden. Steven Culp, Trevor Goddard and Karri Turner have continuous arcs throughout the season. Mae Whitman guest stars, Chuck Carrington recurs.

Season 5 (1999–2000)

This season stars David James Elliott as Harmon Rabb, Catherine Bell as Sarah MacKenzie, Patrick Labyorteaux as Bud Roberts, and John M. Jackson as Admiral AJ Chegwidden. Steven Culp, Trevor Goddard, Randy Vasquez and Karri Turner have continuous arcs throughout the season. Mae Whitman guest stars, Chuck Carrington recurs.

Season 6 (2000–01)

This season stars David James Elliott as Harmon Rabb, Catherine Bell as Sarah MacKenzie, Patrick Labyorteaux as Bud Roberts, and John M. Jackson as Admiral AJ Chegwidden. Steven Culp, Trevor Goddard, Randy Vasquez and Karri Turner have continuous arcs throughout the season. Mae Whitman and Andrea Parker guest stars in one episode, Chuck Carrington recurs.

Season 7 (2001–02)

This season stars David James Elliott as Harmon Rabb, Catherine Bell as Sarah MacKenzie, Patrick Labyorteaux as Bud Roberts, and John M. Jackson as Admiral AJ Chegwidden. Steven Culp, Trevor Goddard, Zoe McLellan, Scott Lawrence, Nanci Chambers, Randy Vasquez and Karri Turner have continuous arcs throughout the season. Chuck Carrington recurs.

Season 8 (2002–03)

This season stars David James Elliott as Harmon Rabb, Catherine Bell as Sarah MacKenzie, Patrick Labyorteaux as Bud Roberts, and John M. Jackson as Admiral AJ Chegwidden. Steven Culp, Zoe McLellan, Scott Lawrence, Nanci Chambers, Randy Vasquez and Karri Turner have continuous arcs throughout the season. Tamlyn Tomita guest stars, Chuck Carrington recurs.

Season 9 (2003–04)

This season stars David James Elliott as Harmon Rabb, Catherine Bell as Sarah MacKenzie, Patrick Labyorteaux as Bud Roberts, and John M. Jackson as Admiral AJ Chegwidden. Steven Culp, Zoe McLellan, Scott Lawrence, Randy Vasquez and Karri Turner have continuous arcs throughout the season. Chuck Carrington guest stars.

Season 10 (2004–05)

This season stars David James Elliott as Harmon Rabb, Catherine Bell as Sarah MacKenzie, and Patrick Labyorteaux as Bud Roberts. Scott Lawrence joins the main cast as Sturgis Turner, alongside Zoe McLellan as Jennifer Coates. Steven Culp, David Andrews and Karri Turner have continuous arcs throughout the season. Jordana Spiro, Meta Golding and Chris Beetem also star.

Ratings

US television ratings 
Seasonal rankings (based on average total viewers per episode) of JAG from Nielsen ratings on NBC (first season) and CBS (other seasons).
 Note: U.S. network television seasons generally start in late September and end in late May, which coincides with the completion of the May sweeps.

JAG had generally an older skewing audience: for the 2002-2003 season, the median age viewer was 58 (the same figure was also held by other CBS shows Becker and The Guardian). As a comparison, for the same season, Law & Order and Law & Order: Special Victims Unit on NBC had a median of 50, while The Practice and NYPD Blue on ABC had a median of 48. However, as the article in Broadcasting & Cable states: "fewer broadcast network primetime series than [2013] had median age audiences over 50"

Home media
JAG was not available on DVD (or VHS, with the singular exception of the pilot movie, which was given a VHS release by Paramount Home Video in 1998 ) during the course of its original run. It was suggested that a syndication deal with USA Network possibly prevented Paramount from issuing DVD releases. Before it did happen in 2006, JAG was the second most requested TV series not commercially available on the TVShowsOnDVD website.

See also
 NCIS (franchise)
 CBS All Access

References

External links
JAG at CBS
 

JAG (TV series)
JAG